The di Lampedusa strategy or di Lampedusa principle (often misspelled de Lampedusa strategy) is a political doctrine that in order to maintain the status quo, one must accept change. It takes its name from the novelist Giuseppe Tomasi di Lampedusa, who expressed the principle in his novel Il Gattopardo.

Definition
In the words of Judith Bennett,
The principle is that the best way to respond to seriously disruptive change threatening substantial political transformation is to make concessions to those who are posing it, to appease and diffuse political energies and emotions. In short, the di Lampedusa strategy involves placating, appropriating and incorporating the opposition in order to secure the older-prevailing system.

Origin
Giuseppe Tomasi di Lampedusa's novel Il Gattopardo follows the family of its title character, the Sicilian nobleman Don Fabrizio Corbera, Prince of Salina, through the events of the Risorgimento. In the story, Don Fabrizio's nephew, Tancredi, urges that Don Fabrizio should abandon his allegiance to the disintegrating Kingdom of the Two Sicilies and ally himself with Giuseppe Garibaldi and the House of Savoy. Tancredi says: "Unless we ourselves take a hand now, they'll foist a republic on us. If we want things to stay as they are, things will have to change".

References

Political terminology
Power (social and political) concepts